Jeffrey L. Seglin (born December 26, 1956) is an American columnist, author, and teacher. Since 2011, he has been a faculty member and director of the communications program at the John F. Kennedy School of Government at Harvard University. His weekly column on ethics, "The Right Thing," is syndicated in newspapers in the United States and Canada. Seglin lives in Boston with his wife, a psychotherapist. He has two adult children and four grandchildren.

Early life and education

Seglin was born in Plattsburgh, New York, and grew up in many cities in the northeastern U.S. as well as Santiago, Chile. He attended Boonton High School in Boonton, New Jersey. He holds a master's degree in theological studies from Harvard Divinity School and a bachelor's degree from Bethany College.

Career

Seglin is the author or co-author on more than a dozen books on business, ethics, and writing. He has written for publications including The New York Times, Real Simple, Fortune, Fortune Small Business, Salon.com, Time, Sojourners, MIT's Sloan Management Review, Harvard Management Update, Business 2.0, ForbesASAP, CIO, CFO, and MBA Jungle. He has contributed commentaries to American Public Media's Marketplace radio program and was the host of Doing Well by Doing Good, an hour-long live television program airing out of WCVE-TV, PBS's Richmond, Virginia affiliate.

Prior to 1998, he was an executive editor at Inc. magazine. He was also the editor of The New York Times Global Business Perspectives news service from 2007 until 2014.

Seglin's "The Right Thing" column launched as a monthly column in the Sunday Money & Business section of The New York Times in September 1998 and ran the third Sunday of each month until 2004, when it became a weekly syndicated column.

In his syndicated column, "The Right Thing," he offers solutions to ethical dilemmas posed by readers. The column was syndicated by The New York Times Syndicate from February 2004 through August 2010. In September 2010, Tribune Content Agency began distributing "The Right Thing" column.

In 2003, Seglin published The Right Thing: Conscience, Profit and Personal Responsibility in Today’s Business, a collection of the first four years of his syndicated column.  It was named as one of the "Best Business Books of 2003" by the Library Journal. He is also the author of The Good, the Bad, and Your Business: Choosing Right When Ethical Dilemmas Pull You Apart (Wiley, 2000).

In 2016, Seglin's The Simple Art of Business Etiquette: How to Rise to the Top by Playing Nice (Tycho, 2016) was released. The book reached a Publishers Weekly bestseller list.

Academia

Seglin worked at Emerson College in Boston, Massachusetts from 1999 until 2011, where he was a tenured associate professor and also director of the graduate program in publishing and writing. He has been an ethics fellow at the Poynter Institute for Media Studies since 2001 and was a resident fellow at the Center for the Study of Values in Public Life at Harvard University in 1998-1999. Seglin is a senior lecturer in public policy and director of the communications program at the John F. Kennedy School of Government at Harvard University.

He lectures widely on ethics, business ethics, and writing, including sessions at the Executive MBA Program at University of Wisconsin–Madison, Duke Corporate Education, Harvard Business School Publishing Virtual Seminars, Virginia Commonwealth University, and other organizations.

He also served as a consultant on the business ethics module of Harvard ManageMentor.

Awards

Trust Across America named Seglin as one of the Top 100 Thought Leaders in Trustworthy Business Behavior from 2010-2014, and honored him with the organization's Lifetime Achievement Award in January 2015.

The student body of Harvard Kennedy School presented Seglin with the Manuel C. Carballo Award for Excellence in Teaching in May 2017. He was co-recipient of the Carballo Award in May 2014.

Bethany College awarded Seglin a Doctor of Humane Letters on March 6, 2014.

Selected works
The Simple Art of Business Etiquette: How to Rise to the Top by Playing Nice. Tycho, 2016.  
 The Right Thing: Conscience, Profit and Personal Responsibility in Today’s Business. Spiro Press, 2003.   Smith-Kerr, 2006.  
 The Good, the Bad, and Your Business: Choosing Right When Ethical Dilemmas Pull You Apart. New York: Wiley, 2000.   Smith-Kerr, 2007.

References

External links
The Right Thing Blog
Harvard Kennedy School faculty page
Harvard Kennedy School Communications Program
Seglin video on business ethics for Harvard Business Publishing
Seglin on Fox 25 Morning News

How to Write an Op-Ed video

1956 births
Living people
Bethany College (West Virginia) alumni
Harvard Divinity School alumni
American magazine editors
Boonton High School alumni
Emerson College faculty
People from Boonton, New Jersey
Writers from New Jersey
Harvard Kennedy School faculty
Harvard Kennedy School staff
Harvard University alumni
People from Plattsburgh, New York
People from Dorchester, Massachusetts